Woodrow Wilson Woolwine Strode (July 25, 1914 – December 31, 1994) was an American athlete and actor. He was a decathlete and football star who was one of the first Black American players in the National Football League in the postwar era. After football, he went on to become a film actor, where he was nominated for a Golden Globe Award for Best Supporting Actor for his role in Spartacus in 1960. Strode also served in the United States Army Air Corps during World War II.

Early life and athletic career
Strode was born in Los Angeles. His parents were from New Orleans; his grandmother was African-American and "part Cherokee" and his grandfather was an African-American who claimed his own grandmother was Creek.

He attended Thomas Jefferson High School in South East Los Angeles and college at UCLA, where he was a member of Alpha Phi Alpha fraternity.

"I got a cultural education—majored in history and education," he said in a 1971 interview. "Never used it, but I could walk into the White House with it now."

Strode posed for a nude portrait, part of Hubert Stowitts's acclaimed exhibition of athletic portraits shown at the 1936 Berlin Olympics (although the inclusion of black and Jewish athletes caused the Nazis to close the exhibit).

College career
Strode, Kenny Washington, and Jackie Robinson starred on the 1939 UCLA Bruins football team, in which they made up three of the four backfield players. They became famous nationally as "the Gold Dust gang".

Along with Ray Bartlett, there were four Black Americans playing for the Bruins, when only a few dozen at all played on other college football teams. They played eventual conference and national champion USC to a scoreless tie with the 1940 Rose Bowl on the line. It was the first UCLA–USC rivalry football game with national implications.

Early acting appearances
Strode made his first appearance in Sundown (1941) playing a native policeman. He had a small role in Star Spangled Rhythm (1942), as a chauffeur of Rochester (Edward Anderson) and could be glimpsed in No Time for Love (1943).

Professional football career
When World War II broke out, Strode was playing for the Hollywood Bears in the Pacific Coast Professional Football League. He was drafted at age 27 and soon joined the United States Army Air Corps and spent the war unloading bombs in Guam and the Marianas, as well as playing on the Army football team at March Field in Riverside, California.

After the war, he worked at serving subpoenas and escorting prisoners for the L.A. County District Attorney's Office. Strode and Kenny Washington were two of the first African-Americans to play in major college programs and later the modern National Football League (along with Marion Motley and Bill Willis, who signed with the contemporary rival All-America Football Conference), playing for the Los Angeles Rams in 1946.  No black men had played in the NFL from 1933 to 1946. UCLA teammate Jackie Robinson would go on to break the color barrier in Major League Baseball (in fact, Robinson, Strode, and Washington had all played in the semi-professional Pacific Coast Professional Football League earlier in the decade).

When out on the road with the team, Strode had his first experience with racism, something he wasn't aware of growing up in Los Angeles. "We were unconscious of color. We used to sit in the best seats at the Coconut Grove (a nightclub in the Ambassador Hotel) listening to Donald Novis sing. If someone said, 'there's a Negro over there,' I was just as apt as anyone to turn around and say 'Where?'" He also said, "On the Pacific Coast there wasn't anything we couldn't do. As we got out of the L.A. area we found these racial tensions. Hell, we thought we were white."

In 1948 he signed with the Brooklyn Dodgers of the AAFC, but was released before the season started, whereupon he joined the Calgary Stampeders of the Western Interprovincial Football Union in Canada, where he was a member of Calgary's 1948 Grey Cup Championship team before retiring due to injury in 1949. He broke two ribs and a shoulder. "It was like I had fought Joe Louis," he recalled.

Professional wrestling career
In 1941, Strode had dabbled for several months in professional wrestling.  Following the end of his football career in 1949, he returned to wrestling part-time between acting jobs until 1962, wrestling the likes of Gorgeous George.

In 1952, Strode wrestled almost every week from August 12, 1952, to December 10, 1952, in different cities in California. He was billed as the Pacific Coast Heavyweight Wrestling Champion and the Pacific Coast Negro Heavyweight Wrestling Champion in 1962. He later teamed up with both Bobo Brazil and Bearcat Wright.

Acting career
Strode's acting career was re-activated when producer Walter Mirisch spotted him wrestling and cast him as  an African warrior in The Lion Hunters (1951), one of the Bomba the Jungle Boy series.

They wanted him to shave his head. He was reluctant until they offered him $500 a week.  “I said, ‘All right, where are the pluckers?’" Then Strode realised, “I was out in the world market with a bald head. Trapped for life. Finally, it became way of life.”

He had roles in Bride of the Gorilla (1951), African Treasure (1951) (another Bomba film), an episode of Dangerous Assignment (1952), Caribbean (1952), and Androcles and the Lion (1952), playing the lion, "the toughest job I ever had" he said later.

Strode was in City Beneath the Sea (1953) directed by Budd Boetticher, and The Royal African Rifles. Also, he appeared in several episodes of the 1952–1954 television series Ramar of the Jungle, where he portrayed an African warrior.

Strode was a gladiator in Demetrius and the Gladiators (1954) and was in Jungle Man-Eaters (1954), a Jungle Jim film. He could be seen in The Gambler from Natchez (1954), Jungle Gents (1954) a Bowery Boys movie set in Africa, and The Silver Chalice (1954).

He was in a TV adaptation of Mandrake the Magician (1954), a pilot for a series that was not picked up, and had small parts in Son of Sinbad (1955), Soldiers of Fortune (1955), and Buruuba (1956) a Japanese film set in Africa.

He appeared once on Johnny Weissmuller's 1955–1956 syndicated television series Jungle Jim and was in an episode of Private Secretary.

Cecil B. DeMille cast him in The Ten Commandments (1956) as a slave at $500 a week for five weeks. They were unable to find anyone to play the Ethiopian king so Strode was given that role too.

He had a support role in Tarzan's Fight for Life (1958) and a small part in The Buccaneer (1958). In 1959 he portrayed the conflicted, some would say cowardly, Private Franklin in Pork Chop Hill, which brought him critical acclaim. He called it "the first dramatic thing that I had done."

He guest starred on The Man from Blackhawk (1960).

Rising fame

Strode was next cast in Spartacus (1960) as the Ethiopian gladiator Draba, in which he has to fight Spartacus (played by Kirk Douglas) to the death. Draba wins the contest, but instead of killing Spartacus, he attacks the Roman military commander who paid for the fight. He is killed and his death sparks a gladiator rebellion.

Strode had an excellent support part in The Last Voyage (1960) playing a heroic stoker, though he was only billed fifth.

While making Pork Chop Hill he became a close friend of director John Ford. Ford gave Strode the title role in Sergeant Rutledge (1960) as a member of the Ninth Cavalry, who is greatly admired by the other black soldiers in the unit and is falsely accused of the rape and murder of a white woman.

"The big studios wanted an actor like Sidney [Poitier] or [Harry] Belafonte," recalled Strode. "And this is not being facetious, but Mr. Ford defended me; and I don't know that this is going on. He said, "Well, they're not tough enough to do what I want Sergeant Rutledge to be."

"That was a classic," he later said. "It had dignity. John Ford put classic words in my mouth... You never seen a Negro come off a mountain like John Wayne before. I had the greatest Glory Hallelujah ride across the Pecos River that any black man ever had on the screen. And I did it myself. I carried the whole black race across that river."

Strode had difficulty maintaining the momentum of these roles. He was in The Sins of Rachel Cade (1961) and guest starred twice on Rawhide, playing an Australian aboriginal in one episode and a buffalo soldier in the other. Ford used him again in Two Rode Together (1962) but it was only a small part, as an Indian. He had a bigger role in The Man Who Shot Liberty Valance (1962) for Ford, playing Pompey, John Wayne's hired hand. In the film, Strode’s character recites the Declaration of Independence but apologizes for forgetting the phrase “all men are created equal,” a poignant line for the 1962 audience.
Pompey/Strode physically carries and thereby saves a drunken, suicidal John Wayne from his burning home.

In 1963, he was cast opposite Jock Mahoney's Tarzan as both the dying leader of an unnamed Asian country and that leader's unsavory brother, Khan, in Tarzan's Three Challenges. He guest starred on The Lieutenant, The Farmer's Daughter and Daniel Boone and had roles in the features Genghis Khan (1965) and 7 Women (1966), the latter the last film he made for Ford. Strode was very close to the director. "He treated me like a son," said Strode. "I had a certain amount of crudeness that went back a hundred years, and that's what he liked."

During Ford's declining years Strode spent four months sleeping on the director's floor as his caregiver, and he was later present at Ford's death.

In the late 1960s, he appeared in several episodes of the Ron Ely Tarzan television series.  Strode's other television work included a role as the Grand Mogul in the Batman episodes "Marsha, Queen of Diamonds" and "Marsha's Scheme of Diamonds".

Strode landed a major starring role as an expert archer and soldier of fortune in the 1966 Western The Professionals. His name was the only one of the four "professionals" that was left off of the movie poster; nevertheless, the film was a major box-office success that established him as a recognizable star.

In 1967 he attempted to produce his own film, The Story of the Tenth Cavalry but it was not made.

He based himself in Europe from 1968 to 1971.

Europe
His 1968 starring role as a thinly-disguised Patrice Lumumba in Seduto alla sua destra (released in the U.S. as  Black Jesus) garnered Strode a great deal of press at the time, but the film is largely forgotten now.

He was an Indian in Shalako (1968) and played a gunslinger in the opening sequence of Sergio Leone's Once Upon a Time in the West (1968). He decided to stay in Europe. "I had five pairs of blue jeans, I was lonely, and I didn't speak the language," he said. "But the producers answered, 'Not necessary. You ride horses.' " 

Strode was in Che! (1969) and supported Terence Hill and Bud Spencer in Boot Hill (1969) shot in Italy. He stayed in Europe to make another Western The Unholy Four (1970) and went back to Hollywood to do a TV movie Breakout (1970) and two Westerns The Deserter (also known as "The Devil's Backbone") (1971), and The Gatling Gun (1971). The scripts for these were variable but Strode later said "Me, I didn't care. If the money was right, I'd play Mickey Mouse.”

Strode went to Europe to make Scipio the African (1971) and did some more Westerns: The Last Rebel (1971), and The Revengers (1972) (a "regular knockdown, drag‐out western”  said Strode).  He later said his salary in Italy went up to $10,000 a week.

He did The Italian Connection (1972), for which he was paid $150,000.  
"Race is not a factor in the world market," he said in 1981. "I once played a part written for an Irish prize fighter. I've done everything but play an Anglo-Saxon. I'd do that if I could. I'd play a Viking with blue contact lenses and a blond wig if I could. My dream is to play a Mexican bandit in the international market."

He was also in Key West (1973), Loaded Guns (1975), The Manhunter (1975), We Are No Angels (1975), Winterhawk (1975), Keoma (1976), episodes of The Quest (1976) and How the West Was Won (1977), Oil (1977), Martinelli, Outside Man (1977), Kingdom of the Spiders (1977), Cowboy-San! (1978), Ravagers (1979), Jaguar Lives! (1979), and an episode of Buck Rogers in the 25th Century (1979).

Later career
Strode's later appearances included Cuba Crossing (1980),The Dukes of Hazzard  (1980), Scream (1981), Fantasy Island (1981), Vigilante (1982), Invaders of the Lost Gold (1982), Angkor: Cambodia Express (1983), The Black Stallion Returns (1983), The Violent Breed (1984), Jungle Warriors (1984), The Cotton Club (1984), The Final Executioner (1984), Lust in the Dust (1985), On Fire (1987), and A Gathering of Old Men (1987).

Strode was in Storyville (1992), and Posse (1992), working with director Mario Van Peebles. His last film was The Quick and the Dead (1995), which starred Sharon Stone, Gene Hackman, Leonardo DiCaprio, and Russell Crowe. The closing credits dedicate the film to Strode, who died shortly before its release.

In 1980, Strode was inducted into the Black Filmmakers Hall of Fame.

In 2021, he was inducted into the Hall of Great Westerners of the National Cowboy & Western Heritage Museum.

Personal life
His first wife was Princess Luukialuana Kalaeloa (a.k.a. Luana Strode), a distant relative of Liliuokalani, the last queen of Hawaii. "You'd have thought I was marrying Lana Turner, the way the whites in Hollywood acted," he later said.

With her he had two children, television director Kalai (a.k.a. Kalaeloa, 1946–2014), and a daughter, June. They were married until her death in 1980 from Parkinson's disease. He is buried at Riverside National Cemetery in Riverside, California.

Strode was a dedicated martial artist under the direction of Frank Landers in the art of Seishindo Kenpo.

Tributes
Sheriff Woody of the Toy Story series of animated films is named after Strode, as was the recurring character of the Santa Barbara Coroner in the television series Psych.

Championships and accomplishments
Cauliflower Alley Club
Iron Mike Mazurki Award (1992)

Filmography

 Sundown (1941) as Tribal Policeman (uncredited)
 Star Spangled Rhythm (1942) as Woodrow – Rochester's Motorcycle Chauffeur (uncredited)
 No Time for Love (1943) as Black Sandhog (uncredited)
 The Lion Hunters (1951) as Walu 
 Bride of the Gorilla (1951) as Nedo – Policeman
 African Treasure (1952) as Mailman (uncredited)
 Caribbean (1952) as Esau, MacAllister Guard
 Androcles and the Lion (1952) as The Lion
 City Beneath the Sea (1953) as Djion
 The Royal African Rifles (1953) as Soldier
 Jungle Man-Eaters (1954) as One of Native Escorts to Biplane (uncredited)
 Demetrius and the Gladiators (1954) as Gladiator (uncredited)
 The Gambler from Natchez (1954) as Josh
 Jungle Gents (1954) as Malaka (uncredited)
 Jungle Gents (1954) as Moor (uncredited)
 Son of Sinbad (1955) as Palace Guard (uncredited)
 Buruuba (1955) as Native Chief 
 The Ten Commandments (1956) as King of Ethiopia and Bythia’s bearer
 Tarzan's Fight for Life (1958) as Ramo
 The Buccaneer (1958) as Toro
 Pork Chop Hill (1959) as Pvt. Franklin
 The Last Voyage (1960) as Hank Lawson
 Sergeant Rutledge (1960) as 1st Sgt. Braxton Rutledge
 Spartacus (1960) as Draba
 The Sins of Rachel Cade (1961) as Muwango
 Two Rode Together (1961) as Stone Calf
 The Man Who Shot Liberty Valance (1962) as Pompey
 Tarzan's Three Challenges (1963) as Khan / Dying Leader
 Genghis Khan (1965) as Sengal
 7 Women (1966) as Lean Warrior
 Daniel Boone (1964 TV series) - Goliath - S3/E3 "Goliath" (1966)
 The Professionals (1966) as Jake
 Seduto alla sua destra, aka Black Jesus, aka Super Brother (1968) as Maurice Lalubi
 Shalako (1968) as Chato
 Once Upon a Time in the West (1968) as Stony – Member of Frank's Gang
 Che! (1969) as Guillermo
 Boot Hill (1969) as Thomas
 Chuck Moll (1970) as Woody
 The Deserter (1971) as Jackson
 The Gatling Gun (1971) as Runner the Scout
 Scipio the African (1971) as Massinissa – re di Numidia
 The Last Rebel (1971) as Duncan
 Black Rodeo (1972, Documentary) as Narrator
 The Revengers (1972) as Job
 The Italian Connection (1972) as Frank Webster
 Loaded Guns (1975) as Silvera
 We Are No Angels (1975) as Black Bill
 Winterhawk (1975) as Big Rude
 Keoma (1976) as George
 Oil! (1977) as Ben
 Kingdom of the Spiders (1977) as Walter Colby
 Cowboy-San! (1978) as Baddie
 Ravagers (1979) as Brown
 Jaguar Lives! (1979) as Sensei
 Cuba Crossing (1980) as Titi
 Scream (1981) as Charlie Winters
 Angkor: Cambodia Express (1982) as Woody
 Invaders of the Lost Gold (1982) as Cal
 Vigilante (1983) as Rake
 The Black Stallion Returns (1983) as Meslar
 The Violent Breed (1984) as Polo
 The Final Executioner (1984) as Sam
 Jungle Warriors (1984) as Luther
 The Cotton Club (1984) as Holmes
 Lust in the Dust (1985) as Blackman, Hard Case Gang
 A Gathering of Old Men (1987) as Yank
 The Bronx Executioner (1989) as Sheriff Warren (archive footage)
 Storyville (1992) as Charlie Sumpter
 Posse (1993) as Storyteller 
 The Quick and the Dead (1995) as Charlie Moonlight (final film role)

Author
 Strode wrote an autobiography titled Goal Dust.

References

Citations

Sources

External links
 
 
 1940 Yearbook Photo 

1914 births
1994 deaths
20th-century American male actors
African-American male actors
African-American male professional wrestlers
African-American male track and field athletes
African-American United States Army personnel
African-American players of Canadian football
American football tight ends
American male decathletes
American male film actors
American male professional wrestlers
American male television actors
American people of Blackfoot descent
American people of Cherokee descent
Burials at Riverside National Cemetery
Calgary Stampeders players
Deaths from lung cancer in California
Jefferson High School (Los Angeles) alumni
Los Angeles Rams players
Male Spaghetti Western actors
Male Western (genre) film actors
Male actors from Los Angeles
American people of Muscogee descent
Native American professional wrestlers
Players of American football from Los Angeles
Stampede Wrestling alumni
Track and field athletes from California
UCLA Bruins football players
United States Army Air Forces personnel of World War II
United States Army Air Forces soldiers
University of California, Los Angeles alumni
20th-century African-American sportspeople
Sportspeople from Los Angeles
African Americans in World War II